Kahart (also Romanized as Kahrt; also known as Kamart, Kert, and Khirt) is a village in Poshtkuh Rural District, in the Central District of Khansar County, Isfahan Province, Iran. At the 2006 census, its population was 512, in 157 families.

References 

Populated places in Khansar County